Bonifacio Global City (also known as BGC, Global City, or The Fort) is a financial business district in Taguig, Metro Manila, Philippines. The district experienced commercial growth following the sale of a 440-hectare military base at Fort Bonifacio by the Bases Conversion and Development Authority (BCDA). The entire district used to be the part of the main Philippine Army camp.

It is under the administration of the city government of Taguig although the local governments of Makati and Pateros also claim jurisdiction.

On February 7, 1995, Bonifacio Land Development Corporation (BLDC) started planning a major urban development—Bonifacio Global City. BLDC made a successful bid to become BCDA's partner in the development of the district. The Ayala Corporation through Ayala Land, Inc., and Evergreen Holdings, Inc. of the Campos Group purchased a controlling stake in BLDC from Metro Pacific in 2003. BCDA and the two companies now control Fort Bonifacio Development Corporation, which oversees the master planning of Bonifacio Global City.

History

During the American colonial period, the US government acquired a  property within what was then disputed area between Makati, Taguig and Pateros for military purposes. This area (TCT dated 1902) was turned into a camp then known as Fort William McKinley after the 25th US president, William McKinley. After the Philippines gained its political independence from the United States on July 4, 1946, the US bestowed to the Republic of the Philippines all rights of possession, jurisdiction, supervision, and control over the Philippine territory except the use of their military bases. On May 14, 1949, Fort McKinley was turned over to the Philippine government by virtue of US Embassy Note No. 0570.

Under the AFP leadership of Gen. Alfonso Arellano, Fort McKinley was made the permanent headquarters of the Philippine Army in 1957 and was subsequently renamed Fort Bonifacio, after the Father of the Philippine Revolution against Spain, Andres Bonifacio, whose father, Santiago Bonifacio, was a native of Taguig (then part of the Province of Manila / Tondo).

When Ferdinand Marcos placed the Philippines under martial law in 1972, Fort Bonifacio became the host of three detention centers full of political prisoners - the Ipil Reception Center (sometimes called the Ipil Detention Center), a higher security facility called the Youth Rehabilitation Center (YRC), and the Maximum Security Unit where  Senators Jose W. Diokno and Benigno Aquino Jr. were detained. Ipil was the largest prison facility for political prisoners during martial law. Among the prisoners held there were some of the country's leading academics, creative writers, journalists, and historians including Butch Dalisay, Ricky Lee, Bienvenido Lumbera, Jo Ann Maglipon, Ninotchka Rosca, Zeus Salazar, and William Henry Scott. The YRC was a higher security prison which housed prominent society figures and media personalities,including society figures Tonypet and Enrique Araneta, Constitutional Commission delegate Manuel Martinez, poet Amado V. Hernandez, and Polytechnic University of the Philippines president Dr Nemesio Prudente. After Fort Bonifacio was privatized, the area in which Ipil was located became the area near SNR and Home Depot, near 32nd Street and 8th Avenue within in Bonifacio Global City, while the YRC became a government facility just outside of the business district.

On March 19, 1992, President Corazon C. Aquino signed the Bases Conversion and Development Act of 1992 (RA 7227) into law, creating the Bases Conversion and Development Authority (BCDA, tasked with converting Military Bases into "integrated developments, dynamic business centers and vibrant communities."  

On February 7, 1995, the BCDA and a consortium led by Metro Pacific Investments Corporation formed a joint venture called the Fort Bonifacio Development Corporation (FBDC) for the purpose of developing 150 hectares of former Fort Bonifacio land. The private group bought a 55% stake in the FBDC for 30.4 billion pesos, while BCDA held on to the remaining 45% stake.  The FBDC's landmark project was concieved as Bonifacio Global City, a real estate development area meant to accommodate 250,000 residents and 500,000 daytime workers and visitors. The project was hampered by the 1997 Asian financial crisis, but moved forward when Ayala Land, Inc. and Evergreen Holdings, Inc. of the Campos Group purchased Metro Pacific's controlling stake in FBDC in 2003.

Land dispute 
On December 9, 1937, the Deed of Absolute Sale executed by the owner, Don Anacleto Madrigal Acopiado in favor of the American Government covering the area of 100 hectares, portion of Bicutan, Taguig, annotated at the back of TCT No. 408. During the American Commonwealth, it was converted to a Military base, named Fort McKinley. It was during the presidency of the late President Ferdinand E. Marcos' administration when Fort McKinley was renamed Fort Bonifacio and transferred to Makati. Taguig got the jurisdiction over Fort Bonifacio after winning the case against Makati in filed in the Pasig Regional Trial Court in 1993. Makati appealed the ruling, but the Pasig RTC in 2011 still sided with Taguig, saying that Fort Bonifacio including the -EMBO Barangays are all part of Taguig. Makati then asked the Court of Appeals to review the case. The Court of Appeals overturned the Pasig Regional Trial Court's decision and reverted jurisdiction of the BGC in favor of Makati. Taguig has filed a Motion of Reconsideration at the Court of Appeals seeking to revert the decision.

The newest Court of Appeals Resolution was promulgated on October 3, 2017. In an 18-page resolution promulgated on March 8 penned by Associate Justice Edwin Sorongon and was concurred by Justices Ramon Cruz and Renato Francisco, the CA's Special Former Sixth Division granted Taguig's motion to dismiss citing Makati's violation of the forum shopping rule (or pursuing simultaneous remedies in two different courts) and accordingly dismissed the latter's appeal of the earlier decision of the Pasig Regional Trial Court (RTC) which originally ruled in favor of Taguig.

The CA took notice of the Supreme Court's decision on June 15, 2016, which found Makati guilty of “willful and deliberate forum shopping.” 

“However, the Supreme Court has not spoken. Ineluctably, we must adhere. The issue of whether Makati committed willful and deliberate forum shopping in these cases has been finally laid to rest no less than by the Supreme Court,” the CA said in a ruling. With this development, the rightful owner of the former military reservation is Taguig.

Description

Bonifacio Global City is between EDSA and the C-5 Road. There are seven major access points: access from the north and west through Kalayaan Avenue which connects it to the north gate and the Kalayaan Flyover, access from Taguig in the west via EDSA through McKinley Road and to the McKinley Gate; the three main entrances (Upper East Gate, Sampaguita Gate, and Lower East Gate) from C-5 in the east; and from the airport through the Villamor Airbase to the south Gate by Fifth Avenue and Lawton Avenue. BGC and Ortigas Center has been connected by the Bonifacio Global City–Ortigas Link Bridge, with the southern end of the bridge at Lawton Avenue near Kalayaan Avenue.

BGC is home to residential condominiums such as 8 Forbes Town Road, Bellagio, Essensa, Serendra, Pacific Plaza Towers, One McKinley Place, The Luxe Residences, Bonifacio Ridge Twin Towers, and Regent Parkway and corporate office buildings such as Net One and Bonifacio Technology Center. Many Filipino and multinational corporations have acquired properties and have committed to relocate their global, regional or national headquarters in the business district.

Developments

Bonifacio High Street
Bonifacio High Street forms the physical core of Bonifacio Global City and is designed as a three-by-three matrix of high-tech offices and residential buildings, retail outlets and pedestrian-friendly roads and walkways. The grid design ensures a city center that is easy to navigate. 5th and 11th Avenues and 32nd and 26th Streets serve as the boundaries of the city center.

At One Bonifacio High Street, the PSE Tower, which houses the unified trading floor of the Philippine Stock Exchange, the Shangri-La at the Fort, Manila and Ascott Bonifacio Global City Manila are also located here.

The Retail Promenade which encompasses 29th Street is characterized by landscaped areas. Its design concept is centered on an east–west central access with business establishments and activity pods. It offers retail at the ground level and offices at the second floor. The City Square Blocks feature landscaped areas and parks.

Track 30th, an urban park, is located on one side of the High Street. Its amenities include a jogging path and several fitness oriented installations that can be used for exercises such as pull ups. The park can be accessed through a nearby bus stop.

North Bonifacio
The  tower was estimated to start construction by late 2008, by Federal Land, Inc. (led by its president Alfred Ty), on a  North Bonifacio district lot (jointly owned by the Metrobank Group of Companies and the Bases Conversion Development Authority). The tower is the 65-storey Metrobank Center which houses the Grand Hyatt Manila hotel and is currently one of the tallest skyscrapers in Metro Manila.

Forbes Town Center
The Forbes Town Center is Megaworld's 5-hectare township community, where 8 Forbestown Road, Forbeswood Heights, Forbeswood Parklane, and Bellagio condominiums are located. It has a combination of low-density residential development, shopping strip, dining outlets, and other service facilities.

Uptown Bonifacio 
Uptown Bonifacio is a new 15-hectare property located in the northern district of Fort Bonifacio. The area is near the zone where the British, Japanese, and American international schools, and other local schools are located. Moreover, Megaworld Lifestyle Malls also built Uptown Mall in the area.

Health and education

St. Luke's Medical Center, Inc. operates a hospital at the Bonifacio Global City.

BGC has several major educational institutions, mostly located at the University Parkway district. The University of the Philippines System (through the constituent units of UP Diliman and UP Open University) and De La Salle University are two most prominent universities which offer graduate programs for professionals working in the district. Other educational institutions in the area include the Leaders International Christian School of Manila, British School Manila, International School Manila, Manila Japanese School, Korean International School Philippines, Everest Academy Manila, STI College, MGC-New Life Christian Academy - Global City, Treston International College, Dela Salle University - Rufino Campus, and Enderun Colleges.

Transport

Bonifacio Transport Corporation maintains bus routes (BGC Bus) serving the business district, as well as Jeepneys and UV Express, with a terminal located at the Market! Market! shopping mall.

The Land Transportation Franchising and Regulatory Board has launched new rationalized bus routes to the business district, from Diliman, Parañaque Integrated Terminal Exchange, Pacita Complex, and Balibago. All buses, including those to and from out of the metropolis, are stationed at the Market! Market! terminal.

The Bonifacio Global City is also located near the Buendia MRT station, and will be served by the future Metro Manila Subway.

Fort Bonifacio dispute

Bonifacio Global City is part of the larger Fort Bonifacio area which had been a subject of a dispute between the cities of Makati and Taguig. Pateros also claimed control over the area.  In a decision dated 1 December 2021, and handed down on the 27th of April 2022, Associate Justice Ricardo R. Rosario, the Supreme Court of the Philippines declared permanent the 1994 injunction issued by the Pasig City RTC which disallowed the Makati City government “from exercising jurisdiction over, making improvements on, or otherwise treating as part of its territory Parcels 3 and 4, Psu 2031, comprising Fort Bonifacio, including the so-called Inner Fort  Barangays Pembo, Comembo, Cembo, South Cembo, West Rembo, East Rembo and Pitogo.”

Gallery

See also
 Camp Aguinaldo
 Clark Global City
 Color Manila Run
 New York City
 Las Vegas Strip
 Downtown Los Angeles
 Sudirman Central Business District
 Kuala Lumpur City Centre
 Central Area, Singapore

References

 mb.com.ph
 mb.com.ph

External links

 Official Website of Taguig
 Bonifacio Global City
 BGC Taguig

 
Populated places established in 1995
1995 establishments in the Philippines
Districts in Metro Manila
Taguig
Central business districts in the Philippines
Economy of Metro Manila
Financial districts
Planned communities in the Philippines
Makati
Pateros
Internal territorial disputes of the Philippines